The 2014 FXFL season was the inaugural season of the Fall Experimental Football League (FXFL).

Four teams participated in the 2014 season: the Boston Brawlers, Brooklyn Bolts, Omaha Mammoths, and the traveling Blacktips. A fifth team, the Texas Outlaws, suspended operations before the start of the 2014 season and never played.

Full schedule

Final standings

References

2014 in American football
Fall Experimental Football League seasons